The 2002 Six Nations Championship was the third series of rugby union's Six Nations Championship, the 108th international championship overall. The annual tournament was won by France, who completed a grand slam.

Participants
The teams involved were:

Squads

Table

Results

Round 1

Round 2

Round 3

Round 4

Round 5

 
2002 rugby union tournaments for national teams
2002
2001–02 in European rugby union
2001–02 in Irish rugby union
2001–02 in English rugby union
2001–02 in Welsh rugby union
2001–02 in Scottish rugby union
2001–02 in French rugby union
2001–02 in Italian rugby union
February 2002 sports events in Europe
March 2002 sports events in Europe
April 2002 sports events in Europe